The École supérieure d'art et design Le Havre-Rouen is a public school of art and design established in two of the main cities of Normandy, Rouen and Le Havre.

History 
Rouen art school was funded by painter Jean-Baptiste Descamps in 1741, and was officially established in 1750.
Le Havre art school was created in 1800 by Antoine-Marie Lemaître, an architect whose son was comedian Frédérick Lemaître.
The two schools merged into one in 2010.

Notable alumni 
Georges Braque
Raoul Dufy
Othon Friesz
Jean Dubuffet 
Michel Ocelot
Invader

External links 

  esadhar.fr (official website)

Art schools in France
Le Havre
Rouen